Keiyo North is an electoral constituency in Kenya. It is one of four constituencies of Elgeyo-Marakwet County. The constituency was established for the 1969 elections. It was one of two constituencies of the former Keiyo District.

Members of Parliament

Locations and wards

References

External links 
Keiyo North Constituency

Constituencies in Elgeyo-Marakwet County
Constituencies in Rift Valley Province
1969 establishments in Kenya
Constituencies established in 1969